Events in the year 1971 in Bolivia.

Incumbents
President: Juan José Torres (until August 21), Hugo Banzer (starting August 22)

Events
August 21 - coup d'etat removes President Torres from office and Junta of Commanders of the Armed Forces 1971 (Bolivia) rules the country

Births
July 16 - Óscar Carmelo Sánchez

Deaths

 
1970s in Bolivia